Rafael Cansinos Asséns (November 24, 1882 – July 6, 1964) was a Spanish poet, novelist, essayist, literary critic and translator.

Biography
Censinos was born in Seville on November 24, 1882. Through his father's paternal line, he is related to the Cansino Family and Rita Hayworth.

Cansinos was a polyglot; he translated The Arabian Nights into Spanish, as well as the works of Dostoyevsky, and the complete works of Goethe and Shakespeare for the publisher Aguilar. He was among the contributors of the Madrid-based avant-garde magazine Prometeo.

In the lectures he gave in 1967 at Harvard, Jorge Luis Borges mentioned him as one of his masters, and expressed wonder to the fact that he has been forgotten.

Works

Essays
El candelabro de los siete brazos Psalmos ("The Seven Arm Candelabra: Psalmos"), 1914
El divino fracaso ("The divine failure"), 1918
España y los judíos españoles ("Spain and the Spanish Jews"), 1920
Salomé en la literatura ("Salomé in literature"), 1920
Ética y estética de los sexos ("Ethics and aesthetics of the sexes"), 1921
Los valores eróticos en las religiones: El amor en el Cantar de los Cantares("Erotic Values in Religions: Love in the Song of Songs"), 1930
La Copla Andaluza ("La Copla Andaluza"), 1936
Mahoma y el Korán ("Muhammad and the Koran"),

Compilations
Antología de poetas persas ("Anthology of Persian poets"),
Bellezas del Talmud ("Beauties of the Talmud"), 1919

Novels
La encantadora ("The lovely"), 1916
El eterno milagro ("The eternal miracle"), 1918
La madona del carrusel ("The Madonna of the Carousel"), 1920
En la tierra florida ("In the flowery land"), 1920
La huelga de los poetas("The poets' strike"), 1921
Las luminarias de Hanukah("The Hanukah Luminaries"), 1924

References

External links

1882 births
1964 deaths
Spanish Jews
Converts to Judaism
Spanish literary critics
Spanish essayists
Spanish translators
Arabic–Spanish translators
German–Spanish translators
French–Spanish translators
English–Spanish translators
Russian–Spanish translators
Spanish male poets
20th-century Spanish poets
20th-century translators
Male essayists
20th-century Spanish male writers
20th-century essayists
Translators of One Thousand and One Nights
Translators of Fyodor Dostoyevsky
Translators of Johann Wolfgang von Goethe
Translators of William Shakespeare
Writers from Seville